Shota Chomakhidze (born 17 November 1978) is a retired footballer.

Club career
Born in Samtredia, Chomakhidze began playing football for FC Samtredia. He joined Georgian first division side FC Dinamo Tbilisi in 1999, and won the Georgian championship with the club. He played for Armenian Premier League side Ulisses during 2007.

In 2000, he joined Ukrainian Premier League side FC Nyva Ternopil. He would later join fellow Premier League club SC Tavriya Simferopol.

Chomakhidze has played for the Georgia national football team at various junior levels.

References

External links
 Profile at UEFA.com
 
 Profile at KLISF

1978 births
Expatriate footballers in Ukraine
Expatriate sportspeople from Georgia (country) in Ukraine
FC Dinamo Tbilisi players
FC Nyva Ternopil players
FC Samtredia players
Footballers from Georgia (country)
Expatriate footballers from Georgia (country)
Living people
SC Tavriya Simferopol players
Ukrainian Premier League players
Ulisses FC players
Association football forwards
Neftçi PFK players
Expatriate sportspeople from Georgia (country) in Azerbaijan